Olfactomedin 4 is a protein that in humans is encoded by the OLFM4 gene.

Function

This gene was originally cloned from human myeloblasts and found to be selectively expressed in inflamed colonic epithelium. This gene encodes a member of the olfactomedin family. The encoded protein is an antiapoptotic factor that promotes tumor growth and is an extracellular matrix glycoprotein that facilitates cell adhesion. [provided by RefSeq, Mar 2011].

References

Further reading